Naimabad may refer to:
 Naimabad, Fars
 Naimabad, Fahraj, Kerman Province
 Naimabad, Zarand, Kerman Province
 Naimabad, Mazandaran
 Naimabad, Nishapur, Razavi Khorasan Province
 Naimabad, Miyan Jolgeh, Nishapur County, Razavi Khorasan Province
 Naimabad, Semnan